Grizzly Tales for Gruesome Kids is a British animated horror television series based on the generic trademarked children's book series of the same name by Jamie Rix. After the first three books were published from 1990 to 1996, Carlton Television adapted the short stories into ten-minute cartoons for ITV, produced by themselves, Honeycomb Animation, and Rix's production company, Elephant Productions. It aired on CITV between January 2000 and October 2006 with six series and 78 episodes, as well as a New Year's Eve special that was over 20 minutes longer than other episodes. The series returned in a new format for Nicktoons with 26 episodes split into two series under the name Grizzly Tales (also known as Grizzly Tales: Cautionary Tales for Lovers of Squeam!), which aired between May 2011 and November 2012.

Both versions of the series have been nominated for BAFTAs and the CITV series has received numerous international awards from animated film festivals. Both have been popular on their respective channels; the CITV series has often been re-aired on Nickelodeon with the Nicktoons series.

History and development 
In 1993, Honeycomb Animation founders Simon & Sara Bor had signed a deal with Central (later owned by Carlton Television) to create the cartoon Wolves, Witches and Giants. According to Simon, the then-head of Carlton Television, Michael Forte, had initially been hesitant to develop the project until Carlton took over Central, but he handed them a copy of Grizzly Tales for Gruesome Kids and advised them to "Get in touch with the author, and see if you can come up with something." Years before, after the success of his debut book Grizzly Tales for Gruesome Kids, Rix had attempted to use his producer credits to get his work adapted by sending copies to television studios. When Honeycomb and Elephant agreed on a partnership, Rix's producer partner Nigel Planer was performing a few of the Grizzly, Ghostly, and Fearsome short stories during the evenings on BBC Radio 5 (which re-aired on Radio 4), but pre-production was forcibly halted just as storyboarding began due to studio hesitations over the source material and the publisher of Fearsome Tales for Fiendish Kids (Hodder Children's Books) being different from the rest in the trilogy (André Deutsch Limited).

After Wolves, Witches and Giants concluded in 1998, Forte funded a three-minute television pilot based on Grizzly Tales book series. He intended to send it to Greece for Cartoon Forum, but they were unprepared so he sent it to ITV. Nigel Pickard had been the controller for CITV for a year and greenlit the series immediately, with a budget between US$2 million and $3.3 million for 26 episodes, later explaining: "We [CITV] had commissioned a lot of cuddly preschool shows and needed something to act as a bridge between the older and younger stuff in the schedule." In September, it was pitched to Cartoon Forum, which was attended by numerous children's television broadcaster representatives, who unanimously approved and offered a percentage of the budget. Thirteen episodes were created within 15 months for the first series with Rix as co-director and co-screenwriter, Nigel Planer as narrator, and the Bors as directors, with animation divided between Honeycomb, and Elephant Productions' sister company Lough House. Carlton International joined with other British broadcasters to promote and sell the series along with other programmes and films as a combined package for MIPCOM's Media Market and Cape Town's Sithengi Film Festival in November and December 1999 respectively. The first episode — "The New Nanny" — aired on CITV afternoon terrestrial slot at 4 pm on 4 January 2000, followed by twelve episodes that aired weekly until 27 March. To promote the new cartoon, Rix rereleased the first three books with Hodder and Scholastic Ltd., as well as the new More Grizzly Tales for Gruesome Kids, with front covers designed by Honeycomb Animation.

Grizzly Tales for Gruesome Kids (2000–2006)
Each episode had a framing device set in an old Movie Theater (named The Squeam Screen) with its creepy caretaker and his spider companion, Spindleshanks. The adapted stories are short movies on film reels that the caretaker screens from the projector into the theatre, after he finishes talking to the audience about morals and proverbs that will later relate to the story of that episode, as he bullied Spindleshanks through malicious pranks and cowardice. These were an invention from Planer, who suggested that the adapted stories should have consistency. These scenes are animated with Claymation whereas the adapted stories from the books were traditionally animated, then later animated in Adobe Flash.

Episodes were faithful to the original story, however, there were some minor changes. For example, the Cluck family in the eponymous story "The Dumb Clucks" were renamed the Klutz family, and the title was expectantly adjusted. Other notable changes included the use of character models that were constantly reused in many episodes either with minor adjustments or not, alternating between main and background characters: the character model for Dorothy May Piranha from "The Piranha Sisters" is the same "actress" who was Savannah Slumberson in "The Grub-A-Blub Blub". However, the set character appearances occasionally led to an appearance deviation from how the character was described in the original story: the bullying Ginger Pie in "Knock Down Ginger" was described as a tall, overweight boy with pale skin and pale red hair, but his character model – the same one used for Ginger (no relation) in "The Chipper Chums Go Scrumping" (who was a boy implied to be very outdoorsy with his friends) – was a skinny boy with curly red hair. Loralilee's witch doctor cure in "Doctor Moribundus" was adapted out of the cartoon, replaced with the Squeam Screen caretaker's narration claiming that the cure was too disturbing to tell as the viewer is shown the outside her bedroom window, and Stinker's murder in "The Chipper Chums Goes Scrumping" is changed to becoming crippled.

The original four books in the series were adapted for the first four series (although some, such as "The Matchstick Girl", were never adapted) but the final two series featured new stories that would later appear in the Grizzly Tales: Cautionary Tales for Lovers of Squeam! books. The theme music was altered at this time with a completely different melody and a faster tempo than the one used at the beginning of the cartoon's run. The framing device with the caretaker and Spindleshanks disappeared and the end of the opening titles would cut to the projector being turned on. Like the first two series, series five and six were commissioned in bulk as a 26-episode deal.

In 2007, it was announced that ITV was planning to promote ITV4 more frequently, which led to numerous ITV programming being cancelled; Digital Spy and Broadcast revealed that  Grizzly Tales for Gruesome Kids had not been offered a seventh series — despite its popularity — finishing in 2006. Michael Grade, the ITV chairman, explained that it did not make "commercial sense" to generously invest in a children's channel.

Grizzly Tales (2011–2012)
The CITV series was airing as reruns on Nickelodeon when Honeycomb Animation announced in 2011 that a new series would be aired on Nicktoons UK in May. This new programme would have a shortened, catchier name and be "reinvented for a modern audience with even more twisted, dark stories to delight children everywhere" but would remain to a formula similar to the newer book series, Grizzly Tales: Cautionary Tales for Lovers of Squeam!.

Other differences would be the location of the framing device, which was now at The Hot-Hell Darkness instead of the Squeam Screen movie theater and the animation: the hotel scenes were 3D animated and the stories were animated in 2D software. The cinema caretaker was now replaced by the re-invented books' The Night-Night Porter, his half-brother, who banishes horrible children to spend an eternity at his hotel. Nigel Planer, Elephant Productions (now named Little Brother Productions) and the crew returned for this series, and the show, although for a new generation, was as popular and successful as its predecessor.

Characters 
This is a list of the cast that frequently appears in the two television adaptations.
The Squeam Screen caretaker: The caretaker of The Squeam Screen movie theater (revealed online to be named Uncle Grizzly) is the only character who speaks in the CITV series and is voiced by Nigel Planer. He gives the audience morals, proverbs and examples of life lessons, as well as narrating the short movies. In the opening titles, he appears at the end of the sequence, walking up to the projection room to blow out his electric torch and grab a film reel out of a towering stack as he says, "You are welcome to Grizzly Tales for Gruesome Kids, a series of cautionary tales for lovers of squeam!" Not much is known about him from the series outside of being a surrogate mentor, however, he is prone to shapeshift his head into a variety of things to terrify the audience or Spindleshanks. Outside of the series, his character profile is available to view on the official Grizzly Tales website, which reveals that his personal favourite movie he has shown is first series' third episode "Grandmother's Footsteps".
Spindleshanks: A large purple spider that lives in The Squeam Screen movie theatre. He communicates non-verbally (through facial expressions) but occasionally squeaks or speaks. Uncle Grizzly constantly uses him for audience demonstrations but often as an excuse to bully, torture and abuse him for laughs. One ending to an episode showed that he had become a ghost, which made Uncle Grizzly cackle. He is said to have an aunt who lives in Australia. He does not appear in the Nickelodeon series.
The Night Night Porter: The official narrator of the second book series, half-brother of Uncle Grizzly, and the owner of the Hot Hell Darkness hotel; voiced by Nigel Planer. He is similar to his movie theatre caretaker relative through being a mentor to the reader/audience, being the only other character in the television adaptations that speaks. He relishes in punishing children, particularly horrible ones, and shows off some of the tortures that his guests are receiving in their rooms.

Crew 
Forte was executive producer for three series of the CITV programme and was succeeded by David Mercer. Other producers included Clive Hedges (first two series) and Sarah Muller (three and four). The stop-motion was animated by Andy Farago, Richard Randolph and Nick Herbert (Ealing Animation) and the 2D animation was animated by numerous animators, including Gareth Conway, Graham Hayter, Chris Bowles, Sam Wooldridge, Oli Knowles, Dan Mitchell, Casey Fulton, Trev Phillips, Malcolm Yeates, Jon Miller, Daniel Mitchell, Victoria Goy-Smith, Liam Williamson, Francis Iowe, Karen Elliott, Craig Hindmarsh and Steven Buckler.

In 2004, Grizzly TV was created: a sister company to represent the partnership between Honeycomb and Elephant/Little Brother.

Broadcast 

For the CITV series:

For the Nickelodeon series:
United Kingdom and Ireland: Nicktoons
Australia: ABC 3

Merchandise 
The CITV cartoon was available for purchase on DVD in the UK, as well as Porchlight Entertainment in North America and Time Life's Shock Records in Australia and New Zealand. The Nickelodeon cartoon was later released on DVD through the same respective companies, however, it was released in the UK and Northern Ireland with Abbey Home Media.

Episodes

Awards and nominations

CITV series

Nickelodeon series

See also 
Goosebumps
Tales from the Crypt
Freaky Stories

References

Footnotes

Citations

External links 

Grizzly Tales for Gruesome Kids
2000 British television series debuts
2012 British television series endings
2000s British animated television series
2010s British animated television series
2000s British horror television series
2000s British black comedy television series
2010s British horror television series
Witchcraft in television
2000s British children's television series
2010s British children's television series
British children's animated anthology television series
British children's animated comedy television series
British children's animated horror television series
British stop-motion animated television series
British television shows based on children's books
English-language television shows
ITV children's television shows
Nickelodeon original programming
British television series revived after cancellation
Television series by ITV Studios
Horror anthologies
Television series by Little Brother Productions